The men's 400 metre individual medley event at the 2008 Olympic Games took place on 9–10 August at the Beijing National Aquatics Center in Beijing, China.

U.S. swimmer Michael Phelps blasted a new world record to defend his title in the event, and more importantly, claim his first Olympic gold, seventh career, and ninth overall. Phelps expected to get a major challenge from teammate Ryan Lochte, but he pulled away from the field on the breaststroke leg, and then opened up his lead on the freestyle leg to a strong finish in 4:03.84, more than a second faster than his world record from the U.S. Olympic Trials. Hungary's László Cseh earned his first ever Olympic silver medal at these Games, in a European record of 4:06.16. Lochte, who fought off a challenge against Phelps, faded towards the end of the race with a bronze in 4:08.09.

Italian tandem Alessio Boggiatto (4:12.16) and Luca Marin (4:12.47) earned fourth and fifth spots with only 0.31 seconds apart from each other. Hungary's Gergő Kis (4:12.84), Canada's Brian Johns (4:13.38), and Brazil's Thiago Pereira (4:15.40) rounded out the finale.

Records 
Prior to this competition, the existing world and Olympic records were as follows.

The following new world and Olympic records were set during this competition.

Results

Heats

Final

References

External links
Official Olympic Report

Men's individual medley 400 metre
Men's events at the 2008 Summer Olympics